Yūichi Sugita was the defending champion but lost in the quarterfinals to Lloyd Harris.

Yasutaka Uchiyama won the title after defeating Blaž Kavčič 6–3, 6–4 in the final.

Seeds

Draw

Finals

Top half

Bottom half

References
Main Draw
Qualifying Draw

Shimadzu All Japan Indoor Tennis Championships - Singles
All Japan Indoor Tennis Championships